Tadakha is a 2013 Indian Telugu-language action film directed by Kishore Kumar Pardasani. A remake of the 2012 Tamil film Vettai. The film  stars Naga Chaitanya, Sunil, Tamannaah, and Andrea Jeremiah with the music composed by S. Thaman. Nagendra Babu reprises his role from the original film.

The film was successful at the box office. The film won a Filmfare Award South and two SIIMA Awards, with Sunil receiving Best Supporting Actor at both the award, The film received positive reviews, who appreciated performances of Chaitanya and Sunil.

Plot

Sivarama Krishna (Sunil) and Karthik (Naga Chaitanya) are brothers .  Siva is a timid fellow whereas Karthik is the tough guy. Siva's father often used to worry about his elder son as he was very foolish and scared. After, Siva 's father died, Siva gets his Father's (Nagendra Babu) job after his death and is transferred to Vizag  where Bagga (Ashutosh Rana) and Kaasi are gangsters ruling the roost . After joining, Siva when send to various cases, takes help of Karthik but doesn't reveal it to anyone . When a marriage proposal arrives for Siva. Karthik goes to see the bride, is surprised to see the same girl whose grandmother's veena he broke in front of their music shop. When Karthik meets the bride's younger sister Pallavi he falls for her. But is hurt when Nandini ( Siva's wife) reveal that her childhood friend is going to visit India to see Pallavi (Tamannaah). Karthik tricks him to send him back to America. After that, that is a violent attack on Siva and Karthik where Siva is seriously injured but the attack teaches him to fight back and at the end the two brothers finish Bagga together.

Cast
 Naga Chaitanya as Karthik
 Sunil as Sivarama Krishna IPS
 Tamannaah as Pallavi
 Andrea Jeremiah as Nandini
 Ashutosh Rana as Bagga
 Nagendra Babu as Siva and Karthik's father
 Brahmanandam as Neighbour of Nandu
 Vennela Kishore as Ganesh
 Raghu Babu as Police Officer Hanumantha Rao
 Rama Prabha as Nandu and Pallavi's Grand Mother
 Jaya Prakash Reddy as Commissioner
 Srinivasa Reddy as Reddy, Karthik's friend
 Vettai Muthukumar as Kaasi

Release
The movie was released on 10 May 2013 after being given a U/A Certificate by The Censor Board.

Reception
Tadakha received good reviews from critics, now running gave it the rating 3/5 Idle brain gave a review of rating 3.25/5 stating "Tadakha has all ingredients to satisfy masses. apherald.com gave a review of rating 3.5/5 stating Don't Wait For Its DVD." 123telugu.com gave a review of rating 3.25/5 stating "Tadakha makes for a decent summer watch." Oneindia Entertainment gave a review stating "Tadakha is a good commercial entertainer and the director has nicely adopted Vettai in Telugu with few changes to suit the tastes of Telugu audience. It has some sentimental scenes to woo family audience. If you have not watched Vettai, don't miss this film." way2movies.com gave a review of rating 3/5 stating "Thadaka has all the right commercial elements including action, humor, romance, glamour with good technical values, also sticks to the Telugu audiences nativity factor. The film has all the needed elements to set the cash registers ringing at the Box-Office." Telugucinema.com gave a review of rating 3/5 stating "Tadakha is a decent mass entertainer. Time pass flick. Entertaining first half and glamour quotient are its strong points."

Box office

Budget
Tadakha was made with a budget of Collected 15 Crores In 15 Days Declared as Blockbuster]

Andrea took  and Sunil took  as their remunerations.

Soundtrack

Music for the film was composed by S. Thaman. The film's audio was launched on 24 April 2013 at Shilpakala Vedika in Hyderabad through Aditya Music label.

Accolades

Filmfare Awards South
 Won - Filmfare Award for Best Supporting Actor – Telugu - Sunil

SIIMA Awards
 Won - SIIMA Award for Best Supporting Actor (Telugu) - Sunil
 Won - Best Actress (Critics) - Tamannaah Bhatia
 Nominated -SIIMA Award for Best Actress (Telugu) - Tamannaah Bhatia
 Nominated - Best Actress in a Supporting Role - Andrea Jeremiah
 Nominated - Best Actor in a Negative Role - Ashutosh Rana

References

External links

2010s Telugu-language films
2010s masala films
Telugu remakes of Tamil films
2013 films
Films scored by Thaman S